George Moroko (born 5 January 1957) is an Australian former professional rugby league footballer who played for Western Suburbs, Cronulla and St. George in the early 1980s.

Biography
A Western Suburbs junior, Moroko had a stint in Brisbane playing for Souths, before being lured back to the Sydney club for the 1981 NSWRFL season. He was used as a second rower at Western Suburbs, then switched to the front row when he played at Cronulla in 1983 and 1984.

Moroko, who captained Cronulla, finished his career with two first-grade games at St. George in 1985 and was captain of the club's reserves premiership that year.

His son, Nick, played in the Toyota Cup for Cronulla.

References

External links
George Moroko at Rugby League project

1957 births
Living people
Australian rugby league players
Cronulla-Sutherland Sharks players
St. George Dragons players
Souths Logan Magpies players
Rugby league players from New South Wales
Rugby league props
Rugby league second-rows
Western Suburbs Magpies players